Rusiate Rogoyawa (born May 16, 1961 in Cikobia, Fiji) is a former Fijian cross-country skier.

Winter Olympics
He represented Fiji at the 1988 Winter Olympics in Calgary, finishing 83rd in the 15 kilometre cross-country event. He had reportedly "learned to ski while studying electrical engineering in Oslo". He competed again at the 1994 Winter Olympics in Lillehammer. He was his country's sole representative.

References

External links

1961 births
Living people
Fijian male cross-country skiers
Olympic cross-country skiers of Fiji
Cross-country skiers at the 1988 Winter Olympics
Cross-country skiers at the 1994 Winter Olympics
People from Macuata Province
I-Taukei Fijian people
Fijian engineers
People from Cikobia